Drago Jančar (born 13 April 1948) is a Slovenian writer, playwright and essayist. Jančar is one of the most well-known contemporary Slovene writers. In Slovenia, he is also famous for his political commentaries and civic engagement. Jančar's novels, essays and short stories have been translated into 21 languages and published in Europe, Asia and the United States. The most numerous translations are into German, followed by Czech and Croatian translations. His dramas have also been staged by a number of foreign theatres, while back home they are frequently considered the highlights of the Slovenian theatrical season. He lives and works in Ljubljana.

Life
He was born in Maribor, an industrial center in what was then the Yugoslav Socialist Republic of Slovenia. His father, originally from the Prekmurje region, joined Slovene Partisans during World War II. Jančar studied law in his home town. While a student, he became chief editor of the student journal Katedra; he soon came in conflict with the Communist establishment because he published some articles critical of the ruling regime. He had to leave the journal. He soon found a job as an assistant at the Maribor daily newspaper Večer. In 1974 he was arrested by Yugoslav authorities for bringing to Yugoslavia a booklet entitled V Rogu ležimo pobiti (We Lie Killed in the Rog Forest), which he had bought in nearby Austria and lent to some friends. The booklet was a survivor's account of the Kočevski Rog massacres of the Slovene Home Guard war prisoners perpetrated by Josip Broz Tito's regime in May 1945. He was sentenced to a year's imprisonment for "spreading hostile propaganda" but was released after three months. Immediately after his release he was called up for military service in southern Serbia, where he was subjected to systematic harassment by his superiors due to his "criminal file".

After completing military service, Jančar briefly returned to Večer, but he was allowed to perform only administrative work. He decided to move to Ljubljana, where he came into contact with several influential artists and intellectuals who were also critical of the cultural policies of the Communist establishment, among them Edvard Kocbek, Ivan Urbančič, Alenka Puhar, Marjan Rožanc, and Rudi Šeligo. Between 1978 and 1980, he worked as a screenwriter in the film studio Viba Film, but he quit because his adaptation of Vitomil Zupan's script for Živojin Pavlović's movie See You in the Next War was censored. In 1981, he worked as a secretary for the Slovenska matica publishing house, where he is now an editor. In 1982, he was among the co-founders of the journal Nova revija, which soon emerged as the major alternative and opposition voice in Socialist Slovenia. He also befriended Boris Pahor, the Slovene writer from Trieste who wrote about his experience in the Nazi concentration camps. Jančar has frequently pointed out Pahor's profound influence on him, especially in the essay "The Man Who Said No" (1990), one of the first comprehensive assessments of Pahor's literary and moral role in the post-war era in Slovenia.

Early in his career, Jančar was not allowed to publish his works, but when Kardelj's and Tito's deaths in the late 1970s led to gradual liberalisation, he was able to work as a screenwriter and playwright. In the mid-1980s, he gained initial success with his novels and short stories, while his plays earned recognition throughout Yugoslavia. From the late 1980s on, his fame began to grow outside the country, especially in Central Europe.

Since the early 1990s, he has worked as an editor at the Slovenska matica publishing house in Ljubljana.

Work
Jančar started writing as a teenager. His first short novels were published by the magazine Mladina.

Jančar's prose is influenced by modernist models. One of the central themes of his works is the conflict between individuals and repressive institutions, such as prisons, galleys, psychiatric hospitals and military barracks. He is famous for his laconic and highly ironic style, which often makes use of tragicomic twists. Most of his novels explore concrete events and circumstances in Central European history, which he sees as an exemplification of the human condition.

He also writes essays and columns on the current political and cultural situation. During the war in Bosnia, he voiced his support for the Bosnian cause and personally visited the besieged Sarajevo to take supplies collected by the Slovene Writers' Association to the civilian population. In his essay "Short Report from a City Long Besieged" (Kratko poročilo iz dolgo obleganega mesta), he reflected on the war in Yugoslavia and the more general question of the ambiguous role of intellectuals in ethnic, national and political conflicts.

Throughout the 1990s, he engaged in polemics with the Austrian writer Peter Handke regarding the dissolution of Yugoslavia.

The public intellectual

Between 1987 and 1991 Jančar served as president of the Slovene PEN Center and through this role also actively supported the emergence of Slovenian democracy. In 1987, he was among the authors of the Contributions to the Slovenian National Program, a manifesto calling for a democratic, pluralistic and sovereign Slovenian state. During the Ljubljana trial in spring and summer 1988, he was one of the organizers of the first opposition political rally in Slovenia since 1945, which was held on the central Congress Square in Ljubljana. In the run-up to the first democratic elections in April 1990, Jančar actively campaigned for the oppositional presidential candidate Jože Pučnik. During the Slovenian War of Independence, he and several other writers helped rally international support for Slovenia's independence.

Since 1995, he has been a member of the Slovenian Academy of Sciences and Arts.

In 2000, Slovenia's most widely read daily newspaper, Delo, published his controversial essay "Xenos and Xenophobia", which accused the Slovenian liberal media of inciting xenophobia and Anti-Catholicism (Jančar himself is an agnostic). He had been accusing the liberal media of similar attitudes since 1994, when his essay "The Fleshpots of Egypt" blamed the media for having helped the rise of the chauvinistic Slovenian National Party.

Although Jančar has never actively participated in politics, he publicly supported the Slovenian Democratic Party during the general elections of 2000 and 2004.

In 2004, he was among the co-founders of the liberal conservative civic platform Rally for the Republic.

Awards and honors

 1993: Prešeren Award (1993) for his narratives, plays and essays
 1994: European Short Story Award (Augsburg)
 1999: Kresnik Award for best novel of the year (for "Ringing In The Head", Zvenenje v glavi)
 2001: Kresnik Award for best novel of the year (for "Catherine, The Peacock And The Jesuit", Katarina, pav in jezuit)
 2003: Herder Prize for literature
 2011: Kresnik Award for best novel of the year (for "I Saw Her That Night," To noč sem jo videl)
 2011: European Prize for Literature
 2021: Honorary Doctor of the University of Maribor

Selected bibliography

Novels
 Petintrideset stopinj (1974). Thirty-Five Degrees
 Galjot (1978). The Galley Slave, trans. Michael Biggins (2011).
 Severni sij (1984). Northern Lights, trans. Michael Biggins (2001).
 Pogled angela (1992). Angel's Gaze
 Posmehljivo poželenje (1993). Mocking Desire, trans. Michael Biggins (1998).
 Zvenenje v glavi (1998). Ringing in the Head
 Katarina, pav in jezuit (2000). Katarina, the Peacock and the Jesuit
 Graditelj (2006). The Builder
 Drevo brez imena (2008). The Tree with No Name, trans. Michael Biggins (2014).
 To noč sem jo videl (2010). I Saw Her That Night, trans. Michael Biggins (2016).
 In ljubezen tudi (2017). And Love Itself
Ob nastanku sveta (2022). At the Creation of the World
Short story collections

 Romanje gospoda Houžvičke (1971). The Pilgrimage of Houžvičke
 O bledem hudodelcu (1978). About a Pale Criminal
 Smrt pri Mariji Snežni (1985). Death at Mary of the Snows
 Pogled angela (1992). The Look of an Angel
 Augsburg in druge resnične pripovedi (1994). Augsburg and Other True Stories
 Ultima kreatura (1995)
 Prikazen iz Rovenske (1998). The Specter from Rovenska
 Človek, ki je pogledal v tolmun (2004). The Man Who Looked into a Tarn
 Joyce's Pupil (2006). Trans. Alasdair MacKinnon, Lili Potpara and Andrew Baruch Wachtel. Selections from Smrt pri Mariji Snežni, Pogled angela, Augsburg, Ultima kreatura, and others.
 The Prophecy and Other Stories (2009). Trans. Andrew Baruch Wachtel. Selections from Smrt pri Mariji Snežni, Prikazen iz Rovenske, and Človek, ki je pogledal v tolmun.

Plays
 Disident Arnož in njegovi (1982). Dissident Arnož and His Band
 Veliki briljantni valček (1985). The Great Brilliant Waltz
 Vsi tirani mameluki so hud konec vzeli ... (1986). All Mameluk Tyrants Had a Bad End...
 Daedalus (1988)
 Klementov padec (1988). Klement's Fall
 Zalezujoč Godota (1988). Stakeout at Godot's, trans. Anne Čeh (1997).
 Halštat (1994)
 Severni sij (2005). Northern Lights
 Niha ura tiha (2007). The Silently Oscillating Clock

Essays
 Razbiti vrč (1992). The Broken Jug
 Egiptovski lonci mesa (1994). The Fleshpots of Egypt
 Brioni (2002)
 Duša Evrope (2006). Europe's Soul

See also

List of Slovenian writers
Slovenian literature
Culture of Slovenia
Simona Škrabec

References

External links

Jean Améry-Prize to Drago Jančar 
"Drago Jančar: Critical Observer of Society" (Article in Slovenia News) 
Short Biography in the Journal Transcript (with picture) 

dB, or a Brief History of Noise, essai by Drago Jančar January 2010 

Writers from Maribor
Slovenian dramatists and playwrights
Slovenian novelists
Slovenian male short story writers
Slovenian short story writers
Slovenian essayists
Members of the Slovenian Academy of Sciences and Arts
1948 births
Living people
Prešeren Award laureates
Kresnik Award laureates
University of Maribor alumni
Members of the European Academy of Sciences and Arts
Herder Prize recipients
20th-century Slovenian writers
21st-century Slovenian writers
20th-century male writers